Namibicola barrettae is a species of snout moth in the genus Namibicola. It was described by George Hampson in 1901 and is known from South Africa (including Annshaw, Eastern Cape, the type location).

References

Endemic moths of South Africa
Moths described in 1901
Phycitinae